Hermansky–Pudlak syndrome 1 protein is a protein that in humans is encoded by the HPS1 gene.

This gene encodes a protein that may play a role in organelle biogenesis associated with melanosomes, platelet dense granules, and lysosomes. The encoded protein is a component of three different protein complexes termed biogenesis of lysosome-related organelles complex (BLOC)-3, BLOC4, and BLOC5. Mutations in this gene are associated with Hermansky–Pudlak syndrome type 1. Multiple transcript variants encoding distinct isoforms have been identified for this gene; the full-length sequences of some of these have not been determined yet.

References

External links
  GeneReviews/NCBI/NIH/UW entry on Hermansky–Pudlak syndrome

Further reading